Mathias Johnsrud Emilsen (born 8 June 2003) is a Norwegian footballer who plays as a midfielder for Vålerenga.

Career statistics

Club

Notes

References

2003 births
Living people
Footballers from Oslo
Norwegian footballers
Norway youth international footballers
Association football midfielders
Lyn Fotball players
Vålerenga Fotball players
Eliteserien players
Norwegian Second Division players